The Terre Blanche Hotel Spa Golf Resort is located at Tourrettes, Var, just southeast of Fayence in the Provence region of France. 

The estate became the property of the Bouge family in the 18th century. Sean Connery owned the property for 20 years before he sold the château and its surrounding 266 hectares to Dietmar Hopp in 1999. Hopp transformed the property into an exclusive golf resort with luxury properties, two championship golf courses, the Terre Blanche Hotel Spa Golf Resort, and a world class spa. It was ranked as 5th in the CNN Money dream vacation home guide. The domaine is 30–45 minutes by car from Cannes, Nice, and St Tropez, and one hour from Monaco.

Notes

External links

Terre Blanche - Official Website

Terre Blanche
Golf clubs and courses in France
Tourist attractions in Var (department)
Sports venues in Var (department)